The 2011 Petit Le Mans powered by Mazda was held at Road Atlanta on October 1, 2011. It was the ninth and final round of the 2011 American Le Mans Series season and the sixth And penultimate round of the 2011 Intercontinental Le Mans Cup.

Qualifying

Qualifying Result

Pole position winners in each class are marked in bold.

Race

Race result

Class winners in bold. Cars failing to complete 70% of their class winner's distance are marked as Not Classified (NC).

References

Petit Le Mans
Petit Le Mans
Petit Le Mans
Petit Le Mans